This is a list of defunct airlines from Yemen including South Yemen and the Aden Protectorate.

Defunct airlines

See also
 List of airlines of Yemen
 List of airports in Yemen

References

Yemen
Airlines
Airlines, defunct